Potomac is an unincorporated community in Ohio County, in the U.S. state of West Virginia.

History
A post office called Potomac was established in 1872, and remained in operation until 1902. Despite its name, the community is not located on the Potomac River.

References

Unincorporated communities in Ohio County, West Virginia
Unincorporated communities in West Virginia